Troy D. Galloway is a United States Army major general who serves as the Deputy Commanding General for the Army National Guard of the United States Army Forces Command since August 1, 2021. He most recently served as the Deputy Commanding General for Operations of the First United States Army from May 1, 2019 to April 2021. Previously, he served as the Deputy Commanding General for the Army National Guard of the United States Army Combined Arms Center.

Galloway attended Missouri State University, where he participated in the Army Reserve Officers' Training Corps program and earned a Bachelor of Science degree in geography in 1991. He later received an Master of Arts degree in leadership and administration from the University of Oklahoma in 2009 and a Master of Strategic Studies degree from Army War College in 2011.

References

Living people
Place of birth missing (living people)
Missouri State University alumni
University of Oklahoma alumni
United States Army War College alumni
Recipients of the Meritorious Service Medal (United States)
Recipients of the Legion of Merit
United States Army generals
Year of birth missing (living people)